Jo Dong-hyuk (born December 11, 1977) is a South Korean actor. He made his acting debut in Make It Big (2002), followed by erotic films Hypnotized (2004), The Intimate (2005), and Searching for the Elephant (2009). On television, Jo starred in family dramas Likeable or Not (2007) and The Moon and Stars for You (2012), period action thriller Yaksha (2010), and medical drama Brain (2011).

Filmography

Television series
Rugal (2020) as Han Tae-woong
Love Affairs In The Afternoon (2019) as Do Ha-yoon
Bad Guys: Vile City (2017-2018) as Tae-soo (cameo)
The K2 (tvN, 2016) as JSS Special Ops captain (Ep. 8)
Detective Alice (web drama) (Naver TV Cast, 2016)
Late Night Restaurant (SBS, 2015) (guest)
Bad Guys (OCN, 2014)
Inspiring Generation (KBS2, 2014)
She Is Wow (tvN, 2013) (cameo)
Moon and Stars for You (KBS1, 2012) 
Brain (KBS2, 2011)
Yaksha (OCN, 2010)
Winter Bird (MBC, 2007) (cameo)
Likeable or Not (KBS1, 2007)
Snow in August  (SBS, 2007)
The Person I Love  (SBS, 2007)
Mr. Goodbye (KBS2, 2006)
Young-jae's Golden Days  (MBC, 2005)
Miss Kim's Million Dollar Quest  (SBS, 2004)

Film
 Blood is thicker than water (2022) as Doohyun 
Love At The End of The World (2015)
Camellia (2010; segment "Kamome")
Searching for the Elephant (2009)
Love House (2006)
The Intimate (2005)
Hypnotized (2004)
Make It Big (2002) (bit part)

Variety show
 Mr. House Husband 2 (2022–present) 
 Cool Kiz On the Block
Beating Hearts (2013-2014)
SNL Korea - Season 4 (2013) (host - season 4, episode 21)
Adrenaline - Season 2 (2013)
My Partner (2010)
Invincible Saturday (2010)
Let's Go Dream Team! Season 2 (2009)
Kko Kko Tours Single Single 2 (2008)

Music video
Lee Jung-bong - "Love Sha La La" (2013)
Dreamcatcher - "Chase Me" (2017)
Dreamcatcher - "Good Night" (2017)

Theater
Fool for Love (2010)

Awards
2012 Asia Model Awards: Beautiful Brand Federation Popularity Award 
2007 Andre Kim Best Star Awards: Best Newcomer
SIEG Model Contest: Second Place

References

External links
 Jo Dong-hyuk at Jina Entertainment
 
 

South Korean male television actors
South Korean male film actors
South Korean male stage actors
1977 births
Living people